Krasna is a river in Ukraine, a tributary on the left bank of the Donets River, within the Don River Basin.

Etymology 
The name of the river means red in Ukrainian.

Geography 
The Krasna flows through the Luhansk Oblast of Ukraine, and has a basin drainage of 2,710 km2. The 151-km long river begins at the village of Tymonove, flows though Svatove, and ends at Kreminna, where it merges into the Donets.
 With a drop of 0.5 m per km, the river is gently flowing. The width of its valley is 3.5 km. The right bank is high, up to 60 m in places, and cut by short but deep ravines. The flat left bank is lower, less than 30 m high and gently cut by tributary streams.

Nature 
The river is protected within the Sieverski Donets National Park.

Sources

References 

Don basin
Rivers of Luhansk Oblast